Long Meadow, also known as Long Meadows Farm, is a historic home located near Winchester, in Frederick County, Virginia. The earliest section was built about 1755, and is the -story limestone portion.  A -story detached log unit was built shortly after, and connected to the original section by a covered breezeway. In 1827, a large two-story, stuccoed stone wing in a transitional Federal / Greek Revival style was built directly adjacent to log section.  The house was restored in 1919, after a fire in the 1827 section in 1916.  Also on the property are a contributing stone-lined ice house, an early frame smokehouse, and the ruins of a -story log cabin.

It was listed on the National Register of Historic Places in 2005.

References

External links
 

Houses on the National Register of Historic Places in Virginia
Federal architecture in Virginia
Houses completed in 1755
Greek Revival houses in Virginia
Houses in Winchester, Virginia
National Register of Historic Places in Frederick County, Virginia